Paz de Río is a town and municipality in the Valderrama Province, part of the Colombian department of Boyacá. The municipality borders Sativanorte and Sativasur in the north, Betéitiva and Tasco in the south, Sativasur and Socha in the east and Belén and Tutazá in the west.

History 
In the times before the Spanish conquest, Paz de Río was inhabited by the Muisca. The original name of the village, now the name of a vereda, Chitagoto is taken from cacique Chitagoto, who was loyal to the Tundama of Tundama.

Modern Paz de Río was not founded until July 20, 1935 by Marco Antonio Mejía Gómez.

Economy 
The main economical activity of Paz de Río is agriculture, predominantly potatoes and onions. Other products are maize, wheat and barley.

References 

Municipalities of Boyacá Department
Populated places established in 1935
Muisca Confederation